Morrow is a word meaning "the next day" in literary English. It also means "morning" in archaic English

Morrow may also refer to:

Places in the United States and Canada

United States
Morrow, Arkansas
Morrow, Georgia
Morrow, Louisiana
Morrow, Ohio
Morrow County, Ohio
Morrow County, Oregon

Canada
Morrow Lake, Ontario
Mount Morrow, Northwest Territories
Morrow Island, British Columbia

People
 Morrow (surname)

Schools
Dwight Morrow High School, in Englewood, New Jersey
Elisabeth Morrow School, Englewood, New Jersey, United States

Companies
TwoMorrows Publishing
William Morrow and Company, American publishing house, now an imprint of HarperCollins
Morrow Snowboards, manufacturer owned by K2 Sports
Morrow Designs, US manufacturer of 1985 laptop computer Morrow Pivot II and numerous early-1980s CP/M microcomputers
 Morrow Property Brokers, Office 1303, Alameri Tower, Tecom, Dubai, United Arab Emirates

Other uses
Morrow (song), a recording by Japanese group Dragon Ash
The Morrow Project, a science fiction role-playing game
Morrow House (disambiguation), any of several historic buildings in USA
Morrow Pivot II, an early laptop computer
Morrow priest, a cleric paid to say mass daily for the laity, especially in a chantry church.
Port of Morrow, an album by the American indie rock band The Shins.
 Morrow procedure, a surgical method for treating hypertrophic obstructive cardiomyopathy (HOCM).

See also
Morrowland, a fictional island in Michael Ende's children stories